The 1848 Wisconsin gubernatorial election was held on May 8, 1848.  This was the election for the first Governor of Wisconsin, which became a U.S. state that year, as it was held concurrent with a public referendum to ratify the Constitution of Wisconsin.

Democrat Nelson Dewey, of Grant County, won the election with nearly 56% of the vote. Dewey defeated Whig Party candidate John Hubbard Tweedy, of Milwaukee.

Democratic Party

Nelson Dewey was a prominent lawyer and real-estate investor in Grant County, Wisconsin. He did extensive business with the lead-mining industry, which was a major component of the economy of the Wisconsin Territory.  He had been a member of nearly every session of the Wisconsin Territorial Legislature, first as a member of the Territorial Assembly, from 1838 to 1842, then as a member of the Territorial Council from 1842 to 1846.  He served as Speaker of the Territorial Assembly in 1840, and President of the Territorial Council in 1846.

Dewey was chosen as a compromise candidate at the Democratic Party Convention after delegates became deadlocked between the lead-mining region's preferred candidate, Hiram Barber, and the eastern region's preferred candidate, Morgan Lewis Martin.

Other candidates

 Hiram Barber, of Dodge County, was a businessman and investor.  He had been a delegate to Wisconsin's first constitutional convention in 1846. Prior to moving to Wisconsin, he had been a Judge in Warren County, New York, for 14 years.
 Morgan Lewis Martin, of Brown County, had most recently served as President of Wisconsin's second constitutional convention.  Prior to this, he had served as the Wisconsin Territory's non-voting representative to the United States House of Representatives for the 29th Congress.  He served in the Wisconsin Territorial Legislature from 1838 to 1844, and had served in the Michigan Territorial Legislature from 1831 to 1835, when the land which is now Wisconsin was a part of the Michigan Territory.

Whig Party

John Hubbard Tweedy was, at the time of the 1848 election, the non-voting representative of the Wisconsin Territory to the United States House of Representatives for the 30th Congress.  He had been a delegate to Wisconsin's first constitutional convention, and had served in the Wisconsin Territorial Assembly during the second session of the third legislature (Winter of 1841-1842).

Independent candidate

Charles Durkee was a merchant, and one of the founders of Southport (now Kenosha, Wisconsin).  He was a member of the Wisconsin Territorial Assembly for the first legislature (1836 to 1838).

Results

| colspan="6" style="text-align:center;background-color: #e9e9e9;"| General Election, May 8, 1848

References

Notes

Gubernatorial
1848
Wisconsin
1848 in Wisconsin
May 1848 events